The Broken Land is a 1962 CinemaScope DeLuxe Western film directed by John A. Bushelman, and starring Kent Taylor, Diana Darrin and Jack Nicholson.

Plot
The film is about a cowboy who rides into a small town that is ruled with an iron fist by a corrupt sheriff. He becomes involved with a pretty young town girl and some residents who are trying to oust the sheriff, resulting in a robbery, a murder and his being pursued by a vengeful posse.

Cast
 Kent Taylor as Marshal Jim Cogan 
 Diana Darrin as  Mavera 
 Jody McCrea as Deputy Ed Flynn 
 Robert Sampson as Dave Dunson 
 Jack Nicholson as Will Brocious 
 Gary Sneed as Billy 
 Don Orlando as Frenchy Douchette 
 Helen Joseph as Ruth Flynn 
 H. Tom Cain as Mr. Flynn 
 Robert Hinkle as Dave 
 Bob Pollard

Production
The film was filmed in Apache Junction, Arizona during the summer of 1961. It was financed by Robert L. Lippert's Associated Producers. It gave an early role to Jack Nicholson. Nicholson later appeared in and wrote a number of films for Lippert, including Thunder Island.

See also
 List of American films of 1962

References

External links
 
 
 
 

1962 films
1960s English-language films
1962 Western (genre) films
American Western (genre) films
20th Century Fox films
CinemaScope films
Films directed by John A. Bushelman
Films scored by Richard LaSalle
1960s American films